Cheluvamba Mansion is located in the city of Mysore, Karnataka. It was built by Maharaja Krishnaraja Wodeyar IV for the third princess of Mysore - Cheluvajammanni and it is similar to other mansions built by them which are spread over a large area surrounded by gardens. This mansion is crafted like other buildings of the Wadiyar dynasty.

Location 
Cheluvamba Mansion is located in the northwestern part of the Mysore city on the Mysore- Krishnaraja Sagar road, near the Mysore Junction railway station.

Central Food Technological Research Institute (CFTRI)
Now this mansion is home to the premier research institute of the country Central Food Technological Research Institute (CFTRI). It has maintained the mansion well since prime minister Jawaharlal Nehru formally received the building in December 1948 and officially it was inaugurated on 21 October 1950.

See also
List of Heritage Buildings in Mysore

References 

Kingdom of Mysore
Palaces in Mysore